Table tennis at the 2017 Southeast Asian Games was held at the MiTEC Hall 7, Kuala Lumpur, Malaysia from 20 to 26 August 2017.

Participating nations
A total of 75 athletes from nine nations competing in table tennis at the 2017 Southeast Asian Games:

Competition schedule
The following is the competition schedule for the table tennis competitions:

Medalists

Medal tally

See also
Table tennis at the 2017 ASEAN Para Games

References

 
2017
Southeast Asian Games
Table tennis competitions in Malaysia
2017 Southeast Asian Games events
Kuala Lumpur